David U. Lee is a Chinese-American Hollywood film producer and entrepreneur best known for co-producing the films The Forbidden Kingdom, Shanghai, and Inseparable. He is the president of the film entertainment company Leeding Media, which he founded in 2008.

Early life and career 
David U. Lee was born in Taipei in 1975. He earned both his BA and MBA degrees from the Marshall School of Business at the University of Southern California.  He started his film entertainment career as an intern in the Los Angeles office of Miramax Films in 1997.  In 1999, he joined Sony Pictures Entertainment in the Strategic Planning and Corporate Development department.  In 2000, Lee was recruited by Revolution Studios as one of the company's initial 20 employees.  In 2002, he studied for an MBA degree while working at K1 Ventures, a private equity fund based in Singapore and Boca Raton, Florida.  Upon completing his MBA in 2004, Lee joined IDG Asia, a subsidiary of IDG.  There Lee oversaw IDG's foray into the Chinese film entertainment business, and launched the Chinese version of Variety.

In 2007, Lee was recruited by Harvey Weinstein to become the Executive Vice President of Asian Operations at The Weinstein Company, where he oversaw the company's Asian business as well as its US$285 million Asian Film Fund.

Film producer 
In 2007, Lee co-founded SDJS/Havenwood Media and produced Already Dead, an action-thriller starring Til Schweiger, Ron Eldard and Christopher Plummer, which was distributed by Sony Pictures Entertainment. Lee was a co-executive producer of the Jackie Chan and Jet Li film, The Forbidden Kingdom, which went on to become the most successful China/U.S. co-productions in history.
 
In April 2008, Lee founded Leeding Media as a film entertainment enterprise dedicated to bridging the U.S. and Chinese film industries. He produced Inseparable starring Kevin Spacey. The company also orchestrated the nationwide release of The Spy Next Door, starring Jackie Chan, the only non-studio foreign film released in China at the same day and date as in the U.S.  Grossing over US$8 million, it became the highest grossing non-studio foreign film in Chinese history until the release of Sylvester Stallone's Expendables.
 
In 2009, Lee advised China Film Group on the co-production of The Karate Kid remake, starring Jackie Chan and Jaden Smith, with Sony Pictures Entertainment. He also served as co-executive producer of The Weinstein Company's first Asian Film Fund production Shanghai, starring John Cusack, Gong Li, Chow Yun-fat and Ken Watanabe.

In September 2011, Perfect World Pictures signed Leeding Media into a multi-year producing deal, making the company the first U.S.-based production company to secure a multi-year term deal with a Chinese studio. Films released under the collaboration include Ghost Rider: Spirit of Vengeance, starring Nicolas Cage (grossed US$9 million); The Last Stand, starring Arnold Schwarzenegger (grossed US$8 million); and Ender’s Game, starring Harrison Ford (grossed US$23 million).

Awards and recognitions 
In March 2009, David was named an inaugural member of The Hollywood Reporter's Next Generation Asia, which celebrates the 20 most impressive young men and women in entertainment in Asia.

Filmography

Producer
 Inseparable (2011)
 Shanghai (2010)
 The Forbidden Kingdom (2008)
 Already Dead (2007)

Distributor (China)
 Potsdamer Platz (????)
 Insurgent (2015)
 John Wick (2014)
 Divergent (2014)
 Ender's Game (2013)
 Parker (2013)
 Last Stand (2013)
 Rush (2013)
 Riddick (2013)
 Hours (2013)
 The Longest Week (2012)
 LOL (2012)
 Ghost Rider: Spirit of Vengeance (2012)
 Blitz (2012)
 50/50 (2011)
 Machine Gun Preacher (2011)
 Alpha and Omega (2011)
 Brothers (2011)
 20 Funerals (2011)
 More Than a game (2010)
 The Spy Next Door (2010)

References

External links 
 

ARTICLES

 Alibaba Is Going Hollywood July, 2014
 Bloomberg Piece on Hollywood vs China's Censorship July, 2011
 LA Times Article, July 3, 2011
 International Film Finance Forum - Singapore 2011
 International Film Finance Forum - Cannes 2011
 Screen Daily Article, February 17, 2011
 San Jose Mercury News Article, November 16, 2010
 China Daily Article, March 25, 2009

VIDEOS

 CCTV Culture Express, Tudou, English
 CCTV Culture Express, Youtube, English
 Bloomberg Interview, English
 Reuters Interview, English
 EBC News Interview, Chinese
 ERA News Interview, Chinese
 Hello! Hollywood Interview, Chinese
 CNBC, February 16, 2012
 USC Trojan Family Magazine, Spring 2012
 China Daily, April 23, 2012

American people of Chinese descent
American people of Taiwanese descent
Living people
1975 births
American film producers
Marshall School of Business alumni